The Nostalgia Box is a video game museum located in Perth, Western Australia. It is the first interactive video game console museum in Australia and was founded by video game lover Jessie Yeoh.

The Nostalgia Box requests that visitors book their tickets in advance online so that they may reduce overcrowding, giving everyone a chance to play at the console of their choice. The Nostalgia Box also allows customers to book out the entire venue for private functions.

In partnership with Perth Film and Television Institute, Playup Perth, the museum hosts events to test games from local Perth developers. The museum also hosts regular themed events.

Permanent exhibits
Featured in the exhibit space is over four decades' worth of video games and over a hundred video game consoles, starting in the 1970s with the Magnavox Odyssey through the 2000s with the PlayStation 3 and Xbox 360 being the latest consoles on display. The permanent exhibits have been set up chronologically to show the progression of the gaming industry and is meant to be a "stroll down memory lane" as well as a "crash course in the history of gaming".

Arcade area

The museum features an interactive gaming arcade in addition to its permanent exhibits, which allows visitors to play a variety of video games. Included in this section are games such as Pong, Space Invaders, Super Mario Bros., Sonic the Hedgehog and Crash Bandicoot. Fourteen different consoles spanning decades are available, such as the Atari 2600 and Nintendo 64, as well as five arcade cabinets, including NBA Jam.

Expansion 
In 2020, the museum underwent an expansion and moved to the lot next to it. It reopened in June 2020, with enlarged museum/arcade sections and more consoles.

See also
 List of computer museums
 List of museums

References

Computer museums
Museums in Perth, Western Australia
Video game museums